Xie Shouchang (19 November 1897 – 22 December 1971) known by his courtesy name Xie Guansheng was a Chinese jurist who served as Minister of Justice from 1937 to 1948. After the government of the Republic of China moved to Taiwan, Xie was President of the Judicial Yuan 1958 to 1971.

Career 
Xie was born in Shengxian, Zhejiang. His grandfather, Xie Tingjun, was a businessman, and his father, Xie Kuang, a scholar. Upon graduating from primary school in 1910, Xie Guansheng was admitted to Hangzhou High School. Two years later, Xie transferred to Xuhui High School, where he graduated and later became a teacher. Xie left teaching to join the Commercial Press, where he helped publish the first edition of the Ciyuan, released in 1915. Xie later furthered his legal education at the University of Paris, where he earned a doctorate.

After returning to China, Xie taught law at Aurora University and Fudan University, among other schools. In 1926, Xie was invited to join the Wuhan-based Nationalist government as a secretary for the Ministry of Foreign Affairs. Xie remained in his post after the Nationalist government had been consolidated in Nanjing. Concurrently, he was dean of the law school at National Central University. In April 1930, Xie began work for the Judicial Yuan. He moved to the Ministry of Justice in October 1934, becoming secretary of the ministry in March 1936.

Xie succeeded  as justice minister in August 1937. In May 1945, Xie was elected to the Kuomintang Central Committee. On April 23, 1947, Xie was appointed to a special committee of the Executive Yuan. He continued serving as minister of justice until December 1948, when he was named the secretary-general of the Judicial Yuan.

Xie retreated to Taiwan with other Nationalist government officials after the Kuomintang lost the Second Chinese Civil War. In May 1950, he was named Vice President of the Judicial Yuan, serving until March 1958, when he was promoted to President of the Judicial Yuan.

Xie died on 22 December 1971 in Taipei, weeks after stepping down as President of the Judicial Yuan.

References

1897 births
1971 deaths
Commercial Press people
Republic of China politicians from Zhejiang
Justice Ministers of the Republic of China
Taiwanese Presidents of the Judicial Yuan
Taiwanese people from Zhejiang
University of Paris alumni
Academic staff of Fudan University
Academic staff of Nanjing University
People from Shengzhou
Law school deans
Educators from Shaoxing
Politicians from Shaoxing
Chinese university and college faculty deans